Sonata was a 3D building design software application developed in the early 1980s and now regarded as the forerunner of today's building information modelling applications.

Sonata was commercially released in 1986, having been developed by Jonathan Ingram independently and was sold to T2 Solutions (renamed from GMW Computers in 1987 - which was eventually bought by Alias|Wavefront), and was sold as a successor to GMW's RUCAPS.  It ran on workstation computer hardware (by contrast, other 2D CAD systems could run on personal computers). The system was not expensive, according to Michael Phiri. Reiach Hall purchased "three Sonata workstations on Silicon Graphics machines, at a total cost of approximately £2000 each" [1990 prices]. Approximately 1000 seats were sold between 1985 and 1992. However, as a BIM application, in addition to geometric modelling, it could model complete buildings, including complex parametrics, costs and staging of the construction process.

ArchiCAD founder Gábor Bojár has acknowledged that Sonata "was more advanced in 1986 than ArchiCAD at that time", adding that it "surpassed already the matured definition of 'BIM' specified only about one and a half decade later".

A large number of projects were designed and built using Sonata including Peddle Thorp Architect's Rod Laver Arena in 1987, and Gatwick Airport North Terminal Domestic Facility by Taylor Woodrow. The US-based architect HKS used the software in 1992 to design a horse racing facility (Lone Star Park in Grand Prairie, Texas) and subsequently purchased the successor product, Reflex.

The Sonata business was founded in 1984 and, by one account it "disappeared in a mysterious, corporate black hole, somewhere in eastern Canada in 1992," after new owner Alias Research discontinued marketing of the product. Ingram then went on to develop Reflex, bought out by Parametric Technology Corporation (PTC) in 1996.

References

Data modeling
Computer-aided design software
Construction
Architecture
Building engineering software
Building information modeling